Lin-ay sang Negros is a local beauty pageant in Negros Occidental, Philippines. Started in 1994, it is the highlight of a week-long celebration called Panaad sa Negros Festival.

Winners

Recent winners

Previous winners

By number of wins

Contestants
Color Keys

Judges

Local titles and festivities

Trivia

Withdrawals and replacements

 Meg Urmeneta was 2002 Masskara Festival Queen but represented Sagay in Lin-ay sang Negros 2004. Eventually she was dethroned and was replaced by Hinoba-an's Blance Marie Brown.

Family affair

Although there were several siblings who have participated in the Lin-ay sang Negros pageant either representing the same or different city/municipality, below are the successful ones to have achieved back to back placement.

 Two Mediavillas represented San Enrique; Richie Mediavilla won the title in 2002 while her elder sister Mizpah Mediavilla was the 1st Runner Up in 1997.
 Two Dinorogs represented Manapla and placed in the semi-finals; Jennifer Dinorog in 1994, and younger sister Janice Dinorog in 2001.

Second Chance

In the entire history of the Lin-ay sang Negros pageant, only one candidate was able to join twice. In 2000, April Tesorero represented Bacolod and made it to the Top 10 but passed out before the announcement of the Top 3. Because of that, she was allowed to join again in 2001 and made it as Second Runner Up.

Stint in national pageants
 Mimilannie Lisondra, Lin-ay sang Negros 1999 1st Runner-up joined Miss University International 2001 in New York, USA and was adjudged the winner. Later that year, she joined Mutya ng Pilipinas 2001 and placed 2nd runner-up.
 Lin-ay sang Negros 2002 Ma. Victoria Durana joined Miss Philippines Earth 2002 but was unplaced.
 Grezilda Ennis Simondo Adelantar (Lin-ay sang Negros 2005 semi-finalist) joined Binibining Pilipinas 2007 but was unplaced. In 2009, she joined Miss Philippines Earth 2009 and won the Miss Philippines Eco-tourism title.
 Lin-ay sang Negros 2009 Vickie Marie Rushton joined Mutya ng Pilipinas 2011 and emerged the winner. As the Mutya ng Pilipinas 2011 winner, she was supposed to represent the Philippines to the Miss Intercontinental 2011 pageant in Alicante, Spain. However, because of the delay in the local pageant schedule, Kathleen Anne Po was handpicked by the organizer to represent. In 2018, Rushton joined Binibining Pilipinas and was adjudged Bb. First Runner Up.
 Alyssa Villarico, Lin-ay sang Negros 2012 joined Miss Philippines Earth 2013 but was unplaced. In 2015, one of her co-candidates, Catherine Joy Marin, joined Miss Philippines Earth 2015 and placed Miss Philippines Water.
 Lin-ay sang Negros 2015 Jessica Zevenbergen joined Miss Philippines Earth 2016 and placed in the semi-finals.
 Lin-ay Sang Negros 2017 Angelica Esther Portugaleza and Lin-ay Sang Negros 2019 Roxanne Toleco represented in their respective editions of Eat Bulaga's  Miss Millennial Philippines in 2017 and 2019, respectively.

References

1994 establishments in the Philippines
Beauty pageants in the Philippines
Tourist attractions in Bacolod
Culture of Negros Occidental
Philippine awards
Recurring events established in 1994